Silent Night, Holy Night is a 1976 Australian animated television special produced by Hanna-Barbera and written by Gene Thompson.

Plot 
During a choir practice two days before Christmas, village organist Franz Gruber is worried to hear unusual sounds from the church organ and suspects the bellows. One of Gruber's sons discovers mice in the pipes of the organ and the mice have chewed up parts of the organ. Without the organ the church choir cannot perform the rehearsed Bach piece because the music was written to be performed with an organ.

Accompanied by both his sons, Gruber travels to Salzburg, hoping to buy spare parts and then mend the organ when returning to the village. The party is caught in a snow storm and the spare part is lost on the way home but pastor Joseph Mohr is simply thankful they are unharmed.

Pastor Mohr (with a little help from the bell-ringer Otto) writes the lyrics for a song and the next morning he brings it to Gruber, asking him to compose a melody for the lyrics. With some inspiration from his wife, Gruber sets music to Mohr's words. At church Gruber and Mohr presents "Silent Night" performed a cappella by the choir.

Cast 
 Kevin Golsby
 Richard Meikle
 James Condon
 Brett Way
 Barbara Frawley
 Boris Janjic Jr.
 John Meillon Jr.

Soundtrack 
"Silent Night" with music by Franz Xaver Gruber to lyrics by Joseph Mohr.

See also 
 The Legend of Silent Night (1968)
 Silent Mouse (1988)

References

External links 
 

1974 films
1975 television films
1975 films
1970s animated short films
Australian television films
Australian animated short films
Films set in Austria
Films set in 1818
Hanna-Barbera television specials
Australian Christmas films
Christmas television films
1970s Australian animated films
1970s English-language films
1970s American films